The Golden Cage may refer to:

 The Golden Cage (book), a 2011 novel by Iranian human rights activist Shirin Ebadi
 The Golden Cage (TV series); De Gouden Kooi, Dutch reality TV show
 The Golden Cage (1933 film), a British drama film
 The Golden Cage (1975 film); Australian film about two Turkish migrants
 The Golden Cage (Mexican 2013 film); La Jaula de Oro, Mexican film about two Guatemalan migrants
 The Golden Cage (Portuguese-French 2013 film); La Cage dorée, Portuguese-French about Portuguese migrants in France

See also 
 Cage of Gold
 La jaula de oro (disambiguation)